Sink or Swim is the third album by Australian folk band The Waifs. It was released in Australia in 2000, and following their growing international success, it was released in the United States in 2002.

Track listing
 "The Waitress" (D. Simpson) - 2:19
 "Lies" (Cunningham) - 4:15
 "Danger" (V. Simpson) - 2:19
 "Without You" (Cunningham) - 3:31
 "The Haircut" (D. Simpson) - 2:29
 "Love Serenade" (Cunningham) - 3:31
 "Taken" (V. Simpson) - 3:30
 "Service Fee" (D. Simpson) - 2:42
 "A Brief History" (Cunningham) - 3:51
 "When I Die" (Cunningham) - 2:55
 "Sink Or Swim" (Cunningham) - 2:00

Personnel
The Waifs
Josh Cunningham - Electric & Acoustic Guitars, Mandolin, Vocals
Donna Simpson - Acoustic Guitar, Vocals
Vikki Simpson - Acoustic Guitar, Vocals, Harmonica
Additional Musicians
Dave MacDonald - Drums, Percussion, Banjo, Additional Vocal
Stewart Speed - Electric & Double Bass
Matt Walker - Lap Steel
Jen Anderson - Violin
Phil Moriarty - Clarinet
Anita Quayle - Cello
Steven Teakle - Accordion

References

2002 albums
The Waifs albums